Dr. Gregory B. Salisbury (May 2, 1910 – January 24, 1968) of Philadelphia, Pennsylvania, was a noted philatelist named to the Hall of Fame by the American Philatelic Society.

Collecting interests
Dr. Salisbury specialized in the study of the postage stamps and postal history of Russia and concentrated his studies and collecting on the imperial issues, such as those issued under the Romanovs.

Philatelic activity
Dr. Salisbury was an active member of the Rossica Society of Russian Philately and helped to reorganize the society after World War II. He served the society as its president and editor-in-chief of its journal, the Rossica Journal of Russian Philately. He was also an active member of the British Society of Russian Philately.

Philatelic literature
Because of his expert knowledge of Russian philately, Dr. Salisbury wrote extensively on Russian postal history in the Rossica Journal of Russian Philately as well as the journal of the British Society of Russian Philately.

Honors and awards
Dr. Salisbury was named to the American Philatelic Society Hall of Fame in 1969.

Legacy
The New York City chapter of the Rossica Society of Russian Philately was renamed the Dr. Gregory B. Salisbury Chapter of the society in his honor.

See also
 Postage stamps and postal history of Russia
 Philatelic literature

External links
 APS Hall of Fame - Dr. Gregory B. Salisbury

1910 births
1968 deaths
Philatelic literature
American philatelists
Writers from Philadelphia
American Philatelic Society